The 2018–19 St. John's Red Storm men's basketball team represented St. John's University during the 2018–19 NCAA Division I men's basketball season. They were coached by alumnus and Naismith Memorial Basketball Hall of Fame member Chris Mullin, in his fourth year at the school. They played their home games at Carnesecca Arena and Madison Square Garden as members of the Big East Conference. They finished the season 21–13, 8–10 in Big East Play to finish in seventh place. They defeated DePaul in the first round of the Big East tournament before losing Marquette in the quarter-finals. They received an at-large bid to the NCAA tournament as an 11th seed. However, they lost to fellow 11th seed Arizona State the First Four.

On April 9, 2019, head coach Chris Mullin resigned after four seasons. On April 19, the school announced it had hired former Arkansas head coach Mike Anderson as the team's new coach.

Previous season
The Red Storm finished the 2017–18 season with a record of 16–17, 4–14 in Big East play to finish in ninth place in the conference. They defeated Georgetown in the first round of the Big East tournament before losing to Xavier in the quarterfinals.

Offseason

Departures

Incoming transfers

2018 recruiting class

2019 recruiting class

Roster

Schedule and results

|-
!colspan=9 style=| Exhibition

|-
!colspan=9 style=| Regular season

|-
!colspan=9 style=|Big East regular season

|-
!colspan=9 style="|Big East tournament

|-
!colspan=9 style="|NCAA tournament

References

St. John's
St. John's Red Storm men's basketball seasons
Saint John's
St. John's